Tony Mauricio (born 22 March 1994) is a French professional footballer who plays as a winger for Sochaux.

He started his career with his hometown club Limoges, and has also represented LB Châteauroux, where he played six games in Ligue 2.

Personal life
Mauricio was born in France, and is of Portuguese descent.

Career statistics

References

External links
 Tony Mauricio at foot-national.com
 
 
 

1994 births
Living people
Sportspeople from Limoges
French footballers
French people of Portuguese descent
Association football forwards
Limoges FC players
LB Châteauroux players
US Boulogne players
Valenciennes FC players
RC Lens players
FC Sochaux-Montbéliard players
Ligue 1 players
Ligue 2 players
Championnat National players
Footballers from Nouvelle-Aquitaine